The Valea Crișului is a right tributary of the river Olt in Romania. It flows into the Olt in Ghidfalău.

References

Rivers of Romania
Rivers of Covasna County